Aedes albolineatus is a species of mosquito in the genus Aedes. It was described in 1904.

References 

albolineatus
Insects described in 1904